JJL may refer to:
 Bedford JJL, a British bus model
 Jennifer Jason Leigh (born 1962), American actress
 Silvery salamander (Ambystoma platineum)
 JoJolion, 8th story arc of JoJo's Bizarre Adventure